{{DISPLAYTITLE:C1377H2208N382O442S17}}
The molecular formula C1377H2208N382O442S17 (molar mass: 31731.9 g/mol) may refer to:

 Asparaginase
 Pegaspargase

Molecular formulas